Pillaiyarmatham is a village in the Thanjavur taluk of Thanjavur district, Tamil Nadu, India.

Demographics 

As per the 2001 census, Pillaiyarmatham had a total population of 1876 with 921 males and 955 females. The sex ratio was 1037. The literacy rate was 77.34.

References 

 

Villages in Thanjavur district